Phước Mỹ Trung is a rural commune of Mỏ Cày Bắc District, Bến Tre Province, Vietnam. The commune covers 8.25 km2, with a population of 7,303 in 1999, and a population density of 885 inhabitants/km2. It is a seat of Mỏ Cày Bắc District.

References

 

Communes of Bến Tre province
Populated places in Bến Tre province
District capitals in Vietnam